Salvia 'Celestial Blue' (also known as celestial blue sage or Las Pilitas sage), is a hybrid cross between Salvia clevelandii (Cleveland sage or chaparral sage) and S. pachyphylla (Rose's sage or mountain desert sage), and possibly involving Salvia 'Pozo Blue' — which is itself a cross between S. clevelandii and S. leucophylla (purple sage). The hybrid parents are native to California.

The plant is a perennial evergreen, with a rounded growth habit and a moderate growth rate. It can tolerate full sun and is adaptable to numerous soil conditions, and is cold hardy down to 15°F.

The foliage smells of musk, and the large, pale violet to periwinkle blue flowers are attractive to bees, hummingbirds, and butterflies. An extremely drought- and heat-tolerant plant, introduced by Las Pilitas, a California native plant nursery, in 1999. It is cultivated in gardens and public landscapes.

References

External links
Las Pilitas website

celestial Blue
Hybrid plants
Ornamental plant cultivars
Garden plants of North America
Drought-tolerant plants